Monika Bustamante is an American voice actor who has performed in various anime productions, including Happy Lesson (OAV) as Kisaragi Ninomai, and Petite Princess Yucie (TV) as Cocoloo.

See also
Dubbing (filmmaking)
Voice over

References

External links
Monika Bustamante at CrystalAcids.com
 
 

Living people
Year of birth missing (living people)
Place of birth missing (living people)
American voice actresses
21st-century American women